Looking for America is an album by American composer, bandleader and keyboardist Carla Bley recorded in 2002 and released on the Watt/ECM label in 2003.

Reception
The Allmusic review by Thom Jurek awarded the album 4 stars and stated "Looking for America is a fun, innovative, and indefatigable album by one of the true geniuses in modern jazz".  The JazzTimes review by Harvey Siders said "Inevitably, sardonic wit pervades her search on Looking for America as fragments of "The Star-Spangled Banner" materialize-dreamlike, impressionistically and, above all, whimsically-throughout the CD". The Penguin Guide to Jazz awarded it 3⅓ stars stating "As an exploration of Americana, this is a fine and fun album".

Track listing
All compositions by Carla Bley except where noted.
 "Grand Mother" - 0:53  
 "The National Anthem: OG Can UC?/Flags/Whose Broad Stripes?/Anthem/Keep It Spangled" - 21:49  
 "Step Mother" - 3:18  
 "Fast Lane" - 5:17  
 "Los Cocineros" - 10:57  
 "Your Mother" - 1:41  
 "Tijuana Traffic" - 8:05  
 "God Mother" - 1:27  
 "Old MacDonald Had a Farm" (Traditional) - 6:15
Recorded at Avatar Studios, New York, NY on October 7 & 8, 2002.

Personnel
Carla Bley - piano, conductor
Earl Gardner, Lew Soloff, Byron Stripling, Giampaolo Casati - trumpet
Robert Routch - french horn (tracks 1, 3, 6 & 8)
Jim Pugh, Gary Valente, Dave Bargeron - trombone
David Taylor - bass trombone
Lawrence Feldman - alto saxophone, soprano saxophone, flute
Wolfgang Puschnig - alto saxophone, flute
Andy Sheppard - tenor saxophone
Gary Smulyan - baritone saxophone
Karen Mantler - organ, glockenspiel
Steve Swallow - bass guitar
Billy Drummond - drums  
Don Alias - percussion

References

ECM Records albums
Carla Bley albums
2003 albums